Health in Afghanistan remains poor but steadily improving. It has been negatively affected by the nation's environmental issues and the decades of war since 1978. The Ministry of Public Health oversees all matters concerning the health of the country's residents.

Afghanistan is generally considered a poor and least developed country. It is one of the only two remaining countries that has not eradicated Polio. Its average life expectancy at birth stands around 64 years (2019). The country's maternal mortality rate is estimated at 638 deaths/100,000 live births and its infant mortality rate could be as high as 106 per 1,000 live births. Around 15,000 people die annually from various forms of cancer. Around 1,000 or more die in traffic collision each year. Around 380 children die from measles.

Overview
Afghanistan became a member of the World Health Organization on April 19, 1948. Its latest estimated population was put as 38,346,720. Of this, approximately 32.9 million are in the country while the remaining 5 million or so reside in Iran, Pakistan and elsewhere around the world. Afghanistan in 2016 had the second lowest health worker density in the Eastern Mediterranean Region (EMR), with a ratio of 4.6 medical doctors, nurses and midwives per 10,000 people, considerably below the threshold for critical shortage of 23 health care professionals per 10,000.

Afghanistan's health workforce shortage is a result of the continues war in the country since 1978, including the historic under-investment in education and training, migration, lack of infrastructure and equipment and poor remuneration. Other challenges also include lack of opportunities for career advancement, staff absenteeism, moonlighting, and weak management. Cultural and socio-economic barriers have also contributed to the overall shortage as well as gender and geographic imbalances in the health workforce. As per the global pattern, many health workers (especially specialists and female doctors) prefer to work in Kabul and other large cities for a notably better standard of life. In addition, policies limiting girls' education affecting health workforce production are still felt and encountered today, especially in more rural provinces.

Health status

The shortage of female healthcare providers has long been seen as an access and comfort issue for female patients in Afghanistan. The shortage of such providers is also a quality of care issue for female patients. Female healthcare providers in Afghanistan may be more sensitive to the needs of female patients, and adult females can interact freely with each other, whereas sex discordant adults face constraints in their interactions that may hinder the ability of a provider to deliver high quality care.

Hospitals and clinics can be found in most districts of Afghanistan but what quality of healthcare they provide is not fully known. Older surveys show that 57 percent of Afghans say they have good or very good access to clinics or hospitals, and Afghans themselves pay approximately 75% of health care costs directly.

On 18 January 2022, UNICEF warned that up to 1 million children in Afghanistan were at risk of death from malnutrition. According to the World Food Programme, more than half the population faced acute hunger, with nearly 9 million one step away from famine. Also due to an unprecedented food crisis, drought and disruptions to vital health and nutrition services, children across Afghanistan were increasingly vulnerable to disease and illness.

Major diseases

Cancer
Around 15,000 Afghans die annually from various types of cancer.

Congenital heart defect
As of early 2023, as much as 11,000 Afghan children are said to be affected by the treatable disease known as congenital heart defect, which is commonly referred to as hole in the heart.

Crimean–Congo hemorrhagic fever
Crimean–Congo hemorrhagic fever (or simply Congo fever) has been reported in the country in recent years.

Hepatitis A
Sanitation issues place the Afghanistan population at risk of contracting hepatitis A through the consumption of food and water that has been contaminated by fecal material. Hepatitis A works by inhibiting the liver from functioning properly. Symptoms generally include jaundice, fatigue, loss of appetite, while some victims may experience diarrhea. Furthermore, symptoms will appear 2–6 weeks after an individual has come into contact with the hepatitis A virus. Efforts have been made to fight hepatitis through efforts by the Pashtun community. Tribal leader Dawud Suleimankhel is credited with establishing an organization that teaches people about Hepatitis, Tuberculosis, and other diseases. Various aid organizations have also started to work in Afghanistan to combat Hepatitis.

Hepatitis C 
Hepatitis C virus (HCV) is a blood-borne pathogen associated with several morbidities and mortality. The state of the infection remains poorly understood in most MENA countries including Afghanistan. Here, the decades of political unrest and military conflicts, and the thriving opiates industry suggest a vulnerability for the transmission of blood-borne infections including HCV. HCV prevalence in the population at large in Afghanistan appears to be around 1%. HCV prevalence among people who inject drugs is substantial with evidence of regional and temporal variation. HCV prevention efforts in Afghanistan should focus on expanding access to and coverage of harm reduction services among people who inject drugs and prisoners. Adoption of the new World Health Organization guidelines for the use of safety-engineered syringes could also minimize exposure to HCV and other blood-borne pathogens.

HIV
The prevalence of HIV in Afghanistan is 0.04%. According to Afghanistan's National Aids Control Program (NACP), 504 cases of HIV/AIDS were documented in late 2008. By the end of 2012, the numbers reached 1,327. Afghanistan's healthy ministry stated that most of the HIV patients were among intravenous drug users and that 70% of them were men, 25% women, and the remaining 5% children. They belonged to Kabul, Kandahar and Herat, the provinces from where people make the most trips to neighboring or other foreign countries. Regarding Kandahar, 22 cases were reported in 2012. AIDS Prevention department head Dr Hamayoun Rehman said 1,320 blood samples were examined and 21 were positive. Among the 21 patients, 18 were males and three were females who contracted the deadly virus from their husbands. He said four people had reached a critical stage while three had died. The main source of the disease was the use of syringes used by drug addicts. There are approximately 23,000 addicts in the country who inject drugs into their bodies using syringes. As of 2015, as much as 6,900 people are living in Afghanistan with HIV and about 300 have died from the disease.

Leishmaniasis
Leishmaniasis is estimated to cause the ninth largest disease burden among infectious diseases worldwide and it is not preventable by vaccination or chemoprophylaxis, but only by personal protective measures preventing bites of infectious arthropod vectors. Four Leishmania species are considered endemic in northern Afghanistan, of which Leishmania tropica, L. major, and L. donovani can produce skin lesions while L. donovani and L. infantum visceralize. Visceral leishmaniasis infections are often recognised by fever, swelling of the liver and spleen, and anemia.  They are known by many local names, of which the most common is probably Kala azar. A total of 21 cases of VL acquired in Afghanistan, all in the 1980s according to CDC reporting.

Leprosy
Despite anti-leprosy initiatives by Leprosy Control (LEPCO) dating to 1984, leprosy is present in Afghanistan, with 231 cases reported in the 2001-2007 period. Just over three-quarters of the cases were the MB-type, with the rest PB-type. Leprosy has been reported in the central Hindu Kush mountain area of the country. Mainly in the provinces of Bamyan, Ghazni and Balkh.

Malnutrition
More than half of Afghan girls and boys experience permanent mental and physical damage because they are poorly nourished in the crucial first two years of life. High levels of malnutrition in Children is rate of stunting 60.5%, One third of children (33.7%) underweight, Anaemia 50% in children 6–24 months, High iodine deficiency: 72%(school age) and also the high levels of Malnutrition in Women is Iron deficiency: 48.4%, non-pregnant and Iodine deficiency 75%.and high levels of chronic energy deficiency are 20.9% low BMI.

Supporting the Implementation of Nutrition (and Health)-Specific Interventions through BPHS and EPHS. The Ministry of Public Health, World Bank and WFP have been working together for ensuring that mothers are healthy before they become pregnant and throughout pregnancy, promoting appropriate Infant and Young Child Feeding Practices, ensuring that children receive adequate health care to prevent growth faltering resulting from illness and early treatment of acute malnutrition and Promote appropriate hygiene practices.

Maternal Mortality
Afghanistan has long been one of the countries that deal with high maternal mortality cases. Initially, having one of the highest maternal mortality rates in the world at 1640 per 100,000 in 1980 to 400 per 100,000 in 2013.

Measles
Measles killed over 380 children in Afghanistan in 2022. Approximately 75,000 people suffer from the disease. Vaccinations against the disease is ongoing.

Mpox
Two suspected cases of mpox (monkeypox) have been reported in Nimruz Province in 2022, which later proved to be negative.

Pneumonia
In Afghanistan, the mortality ratio for children <5 years of age is 90 deaths/1,000 live births, twice the global average; 20% of deaths are from pneumonia. Although Afghanistan is considered 1 of the 5 countries with the highest level of childhood deaths from pneumonia, studies of the risk factors for death and etiology of pneumonia among children in Afghanistan are lacking. The CFR for children <5 years of age with pneumonia admitted to a regional hospital in Afghanistan was 12.1%, compared with only 7.6% for the full WHO Eastern Mediterranean region. Most deaths occurred within 2 days of hospitalization. Factors that may have contributed to the high mortality rate were delays in presentation to healthcare facilities, inability to identify severe symptoms in children, and delayed referral from primary care. These issues could be addressed by strengthening the Integrated Management of Childhood Illness program of WHO, introduced in Afghanistan in 2004.

Poliomyelitis
Afghanistan and Pakistan remain the only countries where the transmission of endemic wild poliovirus type 1 (WPV1) continues. There were two positive polio cases in 2022.

Thirteen WPV1 cases were confirmed in Afghanistan in 2016, a decrease of seven from the 20 cases reported in 2015. From January to June 2017, five WPV1 cases were reported, compared with six during the same period in 2016. The number of affected districts declined from 23 (including WPV1-positive acute flaccid paralysis [AFP] cases and positive environmental sewage samples) in 2015 to six in 2016. To achieve WPV1 eradication, it is important that Afghanistan's polio program continue to collaborate with that of neighboring Pakistan to track and vaccinate groups of high-risk mobile populations and strengthen efforts to reach children in security-compromised areas. The Afghan Ministry of Public Health along with World Health Organization, UNICEF and other such international agencies have been working together to eliminate polio in the country. Wild poliovirus is present in Afghanistan, though in limited areas. Reported cases were on the decline, from 63 in 1999 to 17 in 2007, until increased violence in 2008 impeded vaccination efforts, causing cases to climb up for the first nine months of 2009. While most cases in 2014, 2015 and 2016 were due to poliovirus imported from neighbouring Pakistan, there is also ongoing transmission of virus within Afghanistan. The majority of cases were reported from Nangarhar province in eastern Afghanistan, which borders Pakistan, and were genetically linked to cases in Pakistan.

Tuberculosis
Tuberculosis is endemic in Afghanistan, with over 76,000 cases reported per year. The United States Agency for International Development (USAID) has been engaged in promulgating DOTS (directly observed therapy, short course) treatments, as well as TB awareness and prevention.

BRAC is a development organization that focuses on the alleviation of poverty through the empowerment of the poor to improve their lives. BRAC Afghanistan has been involved in assisting Afghan Ministry of Public Health in the implementation of the Basic Package of Health Services (BPHS) in Kabul, Badghis, Balkh and Nimroz. This implementation was mainly funded by the World Bank and the USAID-REACH (United States Agency for International Development - Rural Expansion of Afghanistan Community-based Healthcare).

Tuberculosis is a serious public health problem in Afghanistan. In 2007, 8,200 people in the country died from tuberculosis and, in the WHO's Global Tuberculosis Control Report 2009, an annual estimated figure of 46,000 new cases of tuberculosis were in Afghanistan. As such, Afghanistan is ranked 22nd in amongst highly affected Tuberculosis countries.

To help control tuberculosis, BRAC Afghanistan started the community-based TB DOTS under the Fund for Innovative DOTS Expansion through Local Initiatives to Stop TB (FIDELIS) project in 2006. In the first phase of this programme, diagnostic facilities for tuberculosis were expanded through the setting up of 50 TB microscopy centres. This phase lasted from January 2006 and up to March 2007. Over the next two years, facilities were further expanded and 92 more Tuberculosis Microscopy Centres were set up under the FIDELIS programme.

The Tuberculosis Control Assistance Programme (TB CAP) was another project taken up between BRAC Afghanistan, World Health Organization (WHO) and Management Sciences for Health (MSH) in a bid to fight TB in Afghanistan. In this project, BRAC Afghanistan supported the BPHS (Basic Package of Health Services) project by replicating the CB-DOTS model into health systems of four provinces: Baghlan, Jawzjan, Badakshan and Herat. BRAC Afghanistan was selected as Principal Recipient (PR) for malaria and TB components of the Global Fund 8.

In 2009, 2,143,354 patients received treatment under the health programs mentioned. As of August 2010, BRAC Afghanistan had covered 388 districts and 25 million of the total population are under the BRAC Afghanistan Health Program. Health facilities also include six District Hospitals, 26 Comprehensive Health Centres, 53 Basic Health Centres, 18 Sub Health Centres as well as 533 Mobile Clinics every month.

Typhoid fever
Being the 15th least developed country in the world, Afghanistan faces difficulties in sanitation. In urban areas 40% of the population have unimproved access to sanitation facilities. Because of this many Afghanistan natives are forced to combat typhoid fever. Typhoid fever is one of Afghanistan's major infectious diseases in terms of food/waterborne diseases. This infectious disease occurs when fecal material comes into contact with food or water. Symptoms vary from case to case but often mild fever is present and if left untreated death may occur.

See also

COVID-19 pandemic in Afghanistan
Ministry of Public Health (Afghanistan)
Environmental issues in Afghanistan

References

External links